Nesar Direh (also Romanized as Nesār Dīreh; also known as Dēhra, Nesār, and Nesāreh Dīreh) is a village in Direh Rural District, in the Central District of Gilan-e Gharb County, Kermanshah Province, Iran. At the 2006 census, its population was 913, in 196 families.

References 

Populated places in Gilan-e Gharb County